Keo may refer to:

 Keo, another name for the Thổ people
 The KEO satellite
 KEO (beer), a brand of beer brewed in Cyprus
 KEO (company), the largest beverage company in Cyprus
 Keo, Estonia, a village in Estonia
 Keo, Arkansas, a town in the United States
 K. E. O. abbreviation for "King Edward's Own", as in several Indian regiments:
2nd King Edward VII's Own Gurkha Rifles (The Sirmoor Rifles)
6th King Edward's Own Cavalry
11th King Edward's Own Lancers (Probyn's Horse)
18th King Edward's Own Cavalry

Surname
Keo is a Khmer surname and a surname in other cultures. People with this surname include:
Keo Meas (1926–1976), Cambodian communist politician
Keo Puth Rasmey (born 1952), Cambodian politician, Funcinpec party leader
Keo Remy (born 1963), Cambodian cabinet member
Keo Pich Pisey (born 1982), Cambodian actress
Shiloh Keo (born 1987), American football safety
Elvinn Keo (born 1988), Malaysian squash player
Keo Sokpheng (born 1992), Cambodian football forward
Keo Soksela (born 1997), Cambodian football goalkeeper
Keo Saphal (Siem Reap politician), Cambodian politician
Keo Saphal (Takeo politician), Cambodian politician

Given name
Keo Nakama (1920–2011), American swimmer
Keo Woolford (1967–2016), American actor, producer, and director
Keo Coleman (born 1970), American football linebacker
Keo Motsepe (born 1989), South African dancer
Keo Nozari, American singer-songwriter